Víchová nad Jizerou is a municipality and village in Semily District in the Liberec Region of the Czech Republic. It has about 900 inhabitants. It lies on the Jizera River.

Administrative parts

Villages of Horní Sytová and Víchovská Lhota are administrative parts of Víchová nad Jizerou.

History
The first written mention of Víchová nad Jizerou is from 1492.

References

Villages in Semily District